Tuditanidae is an extinct family of tuditanomorph microsaurs. Fossils have been found from Nova Scotia, Ohio, and the Czech Republic and are Late Carboniferous in age.

Tuditanids were medium-sized terrestrial microsaurs that resembled lizards. Postcranial material is best known from the genus Tuditanus, showing that it had size, proportions, and skull configuration that were similar to captorhinids. Tuditanids have also developed an astragalus in the ankle (a reptilian feature) from the fusion of several other bones.

In comparison to other microsaurs, tuditanids were short-bodied, with fewer than 30 presacral vertebrae. The limbs are large and well developed. Unlike other microsaurs such as gymnarthrids, the jaw articulation is at the posterior margin of the skull. The teeth are blunt and peg-like.

Tuditanids are thought to have had a similar lifestyle to reptiles such as captorhinids. They were terrestrial and likely fed on insects and other small arthropods. The similarity between tuditanids and contemporary reptiles may have contributed to their rarity in the Late Carboniferous and their relatively early extinction before the start of the Permian.

References

Microsauria
Prehistoric amphibians of Europe
Prehistoric amphibians of North America
Carboniferous amphibians
Pennsylvanian first appearances
Pennsylvanian extinctions